Objectif: 500 millions is a 1966 French film written and directed by Pierre Schoendoerffer who made it after the success of The 317th Platoon (1965).

Plot
Reichau is a one time army captain who served three years in prison for belonging to the OAS during the Algerian War. He arrives in France, unsure what to do with his life. He decides to take part in a heist organized by Pierre, the man who sent him to prison. The heist consists of stealing a bag containing 500 million francs during a plane flight.

Cast
Bruno Cremer as Reichau
Marisa Mell as Yo
Jean-Claude Rolland
Etienne Bierry
Pierre Fromont
Jean-François Chauvel
Thomas Hong-Mai

Reception
The film was not a box office success being the 106th most popular movie at the French box office with admissions of 497,369.

References

External links

Objective 500 Million at French Films

1966 films
Algerian War films
Films directed by Pierre Schoendoerffer
French war films
1960s French-language films
1966 war films
1960s French films
Fiction about the Organisation armée secrète